A saucer is a type of small dishware.  While in the Middle Ages a saucer was used for serving condiments and sauces, currently the term is used to denote a small plate or shallow bowl that supports a cup – usually one used to serve coffee or tea.

Overview
The center of the saucer often contains a depression or raised ring sized to fit a matching cup; this was only introduced in the mid 18th century. The saucer is useful for protecting surfaces from possible damage due to the heat of a cup, and to catch overflow, splashes, and drips from the cup, thus protecting both table linen and the user sitting in a free-standing chair who holds both cup and saucer. The saucer also provides a convenient place for a wet spoon, as might be used to stir the drink in the cup in order to mix sweeteners or creamers into tea or coffee.

Some people pour the hot tea or coffee from the cup into the saucer; the increased surface area of the liquid exposed to the air increases the rate at which it cools, allowing the drinker to consume the beverage quickly after preparation.  This was very common in the 18th century.

Although often part of a place setting in a tea or dinner set, teacups with unique styling are often sold with matching saucers, sometimes alone, or as part of a tea set, including a teapot and small dessert plates.

Thermal transport
When placed beneath a cup, saucers have very little direct influence on beverage cooling rate. For hot, water based beverages (e.g. tea or coffee), cooling rate in a cup is typically dominated by evaporation, which occurs across the free surface in contact with the air. Heat transfer through the bottom of the cup is small relative to heat lost through the top of the cup. Further reducing the heat lost through the bottom of the cup has little effect on the cooling rate of the beverage.

Placing a saucer on top of a cup, however, inhibits evaporative cooling and is thus an effective way of reducing the cooling rate so that the drink remains warmer for longer. The reduction in heat loss due to evaporation is typically much greater than the increase in heat loss associated with conduction through the saucer (and subsequent radiation or convective transfer to the surrounding air).

Historical reference

Gallery

See also
 Coaster, used to protect the surface where the user might place a beverage
Plate, used to serve food

References

External links

Crockery
Teaware